Jonny Persey is a British film producer.

Jonny Persey grew up in North London and attended The Haberdashers' Aske's Boys' School in Elstree.

To-date, Persey's most notable film credit was as producer for the 2003 hit, Wondrous Oblivion. He is also producer of Deep Water, which opened in the UK on 15 December 2006.

Early life

Filmography

References

External links
 ( IMDB entry)

Living people
Businesspeople from London
English film producers
People educated at Haberdashers' Boys' School
English Jews
Year of birth missing (living people)